The Västerås Simsällskap, Västerås SS or VSS, Swedish, is a swim team from Västerås founded November 3, 1910. Its home pool is Lögarängsbadet in Västerås. The club practises swimming, diving, water polo, and masters swimming.

Swimmers
 Agneta Eriksson
 Patrik Isaksson
 Thomas Lejdström
Folke Erickson

Sources 
 Västerås SS official homepage 

Swimming clubs in Sweden
Water polo clubs in Sweden
Sports clubs established in 1910
Sport in Västmanland County